"Potato" is the third episode of the BBC sitcom Blackadder II, the second series of Blackadder, which was set in Elizabethan England from 1558 to 1603.

Plot
The episode opens with Blackadder at home, while the rest of London is celebrating the return of Sir Walter "Oooh what a big ship I've got" Raleigh. Blackadder is typically sarcastic and unimpressed, refusing a ridiculously dressed Percy's repeated invitations to join in the festivities, eventually throwing him out, and likewise refusing to let Baldrick have the day off to celebrate.

The reason for Blackadder's bitterness is his envy of Sir Walter and explorers in general who "ponce off to Mumbo-Jumbo Land, come home with a tropical disease, a sun tan and a bag of brown lumpy things" and return to be showered with fame and adoration. He is equally annoyed with Sir Walter apparently making a fortune from potatoes, with people smoking them or building houses of them, scoffing that "they'll be eating them next". In addition, he has to endure taunting from children outside his house, to which he retaliates by shooting one with an arrow.

Melchett arrives, also dressed in a ridiculous fashion and asks if Blackadder will join him at the royal palace to welcome Sir Walter, which Blackadder initially declines, though he eventually relents.

At court, Sir Walter greatly impresses the Queen with his tales of daring exploration and discovery, and the court join to mock Blackadder for lacking the bravery of an explorer. During his boasting, Sir Walter reveals that sailors do not count the sea around the Cape of Good Hope as part of the "Seven Seas", being known instead as "the sea of certain death" owing to its dangerous nature. Blackadder, in an attempt to upstage the explorer, suddenly announces his imminent plans to make that very journey, to the delight and admiration of the royal court, with the Queen even suggesting she will marry Blackadder when he returns. Sir Walter is disbelieving, stating that only one sailor would be "mad enough" to attempt the journey: Captain Redbeard Rum.

Blackadder seeks out Rum who, despite being both legless and ramblingly insane, he employs as captain for the voyage, bringing Baldrick and Percy along as well. On the evening before setting off, Blackadder visits the court once again, along with Rum and Baldrick, and Nursie, is quite taken with the captain, agreeing to marry him once he returns. Once their journey starts, Blackadder reveals his real plan: sailing to France for a few months, then go back home and falsely claim to have sailed to the Cape of Good Hope. Rum then admits that the plan is very fortunate, as he does not know the way to the Cape of Good Hope, and intended to resort to his usual trick of "circling the Isle of Wight until everybody gets dizzy". Unfortunately, after sailing for three days, they run into a serious problem; Rum does not know how to get to France either, and in fact does not know how to navigate at all.

Blackadder suggests a member of the crew will know how to navigate, but Rum reveals that with the exception of Blackadder, Percy and Baldrick, there is no crew on the ship, stating opinion is divided on having a crew being standard maritime practise. Specifically, "all other captains say it is", and Rum says it is not.

Utterly lost, they sail for six months, having run out of food and water and reduced to drinking their own urine (joining Rum, who has been "swigging his with abandon" even before the water ran out) when their ship finally runs aground. Unfortunately, rather than returning to England, they have arrived on a tropical island with lava streams, mangroves and cannibalistic natives.

Two years later, they somehow land back in Britain, and return to meet the Queen, though they reveal to Nursie that her beloved Captain Rum was eaten by natives, and she is given his beard as a memento. When Blackadder then brings up the subject of marrying the Queen, he finds that in their absence, she has become completely fed up of explorers, having spared Raleigh execution only because he "blubbed on his way to the block", and has had him reduced to serving as the stick in a game of ring toss. When she demands a souvenir from his travels, Blackadder offers Queenie a stick that, when thrown away, comes back. She is displeased until she witnesses an offhanded throw of the boomerang return and strike Percy in the back of the head. Having been commanded to also present Melchett and Raleigh with a gift, Blackadder offers a bottle of "fine wine" (which is actually Baldrick's urine), which Blackadder states is in "inexhaustible supply".

Cast 
 Rowan Atkinson as Lord Edmund Blackadder
 Tim McInnerny as Lord Percy Percy
 Tony Robinson as Baldrick
 Miranda Richardson as Queen Elizabeth I
 Stephen Fry as Lord Melchett
 Patsy Byrne as Nursie
 Tom Baker as Captain Redbeard Rum
 Simon Jones as Sir Walter Raleigh

Notes
Tom Baker has described his own performance as "appalling". Baker was quoted: "Someone should have taken away my Equity Card. It was terrible and the buggers keep playing it." In an interview with Radio Times, Baker said his memories of working with Atkinson were "a little tainted." He stated that Atkinson told him to play his role as "boring" as possible, which was advice he gave to all guest actors. However, after playing his role as "boring" in the final rehearsal, Baker was told not to by the show's producer against Atkinson's advice.

References

External links

 
 

Blackadder episodes
1986 British television episodes
Television shows written by Ben Elton
Cultural depictions of Elizabeth I
Cultural depictions of Walter Raleigh
Television shows written by Richard Curtis